Jonathan Rousselle (born February 7, 1990) is a French basketball player for JDA Dijon Basket of France's LNB Pro A. Rousselle plays as a point guard.

Professional career
He signed with Cholet in May 2014.

Rousselle averaged 7.6 points and 3.9 assists per game in 2019–20. He re-signed with RETAbet Bilbao Basket on June 8, 2020.

On July 12, 2022, he has signed with JDA Dijon Basket of the LNB Pro A.

References

External links
 Jonathan Rousselle at the site of LNB.

1990 births
Living people
BCM Gravelines players
Bilbao Basket players
Cholet Basket players
French expatriate basketball people in Spain
French men's basketball players
JDA Dijon Basket players
Liga ACB players
Limoges CSP players
People from Seclin
Point guards
SOMB Boulogne-sur-Mer players
Sportspeople from Nord (French department)